The 1981–82 Wake Forest Demon Deacons men's basketball team represented Wake Forest University as a member of the Atlantic Coast Conference during the 1981–82 NCAA Division I men's basketball season. Led by head coach Carl Tacy, the team finished the season with an overall record of 21–9 (9–5 ACC) and received a bid to the NCAA tournament.

Roster

Schedule and results 

|-
!colspan=9 style=| Regular Season

|-
!colspan=9 style=| ACC tournament

|-
!colspan=9 style=| NCAA tournament

References 

Wake Forest Demon Deacons men's basketball seasons
Wake Forest
Wake Forest
1981 in sports in North Carolina
1982 in sports in North Carolina